Laigné-en-Belin is a commune in the Sarthe department in the region of Pays de la Loire in north-western France. It was the birthplace of Basil Moreau, founder of the Congregation of Holy Cross.

Points of interest
 Arboretum des Quintes

Notable residents

Basil Moreau, (1799-1873), Catholic priest and founder of the Congregation of Holy Cross

See also
Communes of the Sarthe department

References

Communes of Sarthe